Alexander Goldstein (born August 10, 1948), also credited as Aleksandr Goldshteyn and Aleksandr Goldstein in films, is a Russian–American music composer, conductor, songwriter, record producer, film producer, director, editor and is the founder of ABG World and SportMusic.com. He was born in Moscow, USSR, into a family of Bolshoi Theater Orchestra musicians.

Biography and career
 He is the son of Boris Goldstein, a French Horn player of the Bolshoi Orchestra and nephew of Lev Goldstein, a French Horn player of the Red Army Theater. At the age of 6, he began his studies at one of the most prestigious music educational centers in the world, The Gnessin School of Music in Moscow. 16 years later, he completed his music education by graduating at The Gnessin Academy of Music with a master's degree in conducting and French horn. He started composing music in 1976 in Moscow. He composed music scores for 26 feature films, 2 silent classics, approximately 300 documentary films, animations, countless radio and television shows, circus and stage shows, commercials, and sports programs in the US and abroad.

Over his career as a sport music editor and arranger, Alexander Goldstein has worked with athletes and coaches from 20 countries and helped hundreds of National competition participants spanning 4 different continents. Over 40 Olympic Medals and over 120 World Medals were won using the music that he either edited or arranged.

In 1991, he moved from Moscow to New York City and became Executive Producer and Creative Director at WMNB and EABC in Fort Lee, NJ.

In 1997, Alexander Goldstein formed his own Video and Audio Production Company, ABG World, and undertook projects like the music score for documentary films like Six Days, a 2001 Andrei Zagdansky short documentary about the aftermath of the September 11th attacks, Vasya, a 2002 Andrei Zagdansky film about the life of a Russian painter Vasily Sitnikov, whose works are in the New York Museum of Modern Art (MoMA) and Konstantin and Mouse, a 2006 film about Russian performance poet Konstantin Kuzminsky. He also did the video editing of approximately 50 television shows and Progulki po Broadveiu (Broadway Walks) for TV Channel Kultura Russian Federation and a long-running TV Show Time Out which was hosted by Oleg Frish and produced for New Age Media in New York City, which aired on NTV (America) from 2005 to 2010 and featured memorable exclusive interviews and performances of such American music greats as Paul Anka, Peter Cincotti, James Brown, Connie Francis, Gloria Gaynor, Donna Summer and Russian performers who frequented USA like Valeri Leoniev or call it home like Yakov Smirnoff

Starting in 1999, Alexander wrote original music scores and worked as video editor on 15 films produced by AY Associates, a Maryland video production company, for the US State Department. Among those films are Silk Road Festival, Energy, One Year Later, Alaska, Gagarin and Gore-Bush.

In 2005, Alexander Goldstein relocated to Naples, Florida where he continues to produce documentary films and compose music. In 2006, during the first production of Kings of the Dance with classical ballet performances by Ethan Stiefel and Angel Corella of American Ballet Theatre, Nikolay Tsiskaridze of the Bolshoi Ballet and Johan Kobborg of the Royal Danish Ballet – arguably the four strongest male principals dancers at that time, Alexander created a film about the dancers, which opened the performances at the Orange County Performing Arts Center (CA) and the New York City's City Center. This production was followed by Kings of The Dance II in 2008 and We Got It Good in 2010. Both films received Videographer Awards. Alexander Goldstein directed, filmed and edited all 3 films for Ardani Artists Management.

In 2008, Alexander Goldstein directed and produced Ascension from Olympus, a documentary film about Bobrin's Ice Theatre headed by European Champion Igor Bobrin and Olympic Champion Natalia Bestemianova. "Bobrin's Ice Theatre became the very first ice theatre to invite composers to create music especially for dramatic ice performances and many prominent modern Russian composers contributed their talent – Michail Chekalin, Alexander Gradsky, Alexander Rosenblat, Alexander Goldstein and others."

In 2010, Alexander Goldstein composed Rotissimo, a Suite for Clarinet, Violin and String Orchestra, after film music of the immortal Italian film composer Nino Rota. World premiere of Rotissimo was in October 2011 in Toronto by the Canadian Sinfonietta.

November 22, 2012 Rotissimo had its European Debut at Sibelius Academy, Helsinki, Finland: Clarinet Soloist, Julian Milkis and Violin Soloist, Päivyt Meller.

On April 7, 2013, Alexander Goldstein's Trio on the Roof made its debut at the Eastman School of Music
University of Rochester, performed by Kenneth Grant (clarinet), Mikhail Kopelman (violin) and Elizaveta Kopelman (piano).

In Russia, Alexander Goldstein is known for his expertise on the music of Paul Mauriat, a renowned French orchestra leader who has an official fan club. During First International Paul Mauriat Festival, which concluded in March 2015, Alexander Goldstein chaired the jury.  Nu, Pogodi! fan club in Russian Federation has referred to Alexander Goldstein for music mysteries, which surface now and then, caused by the Soviet-era music source misstatements.

On New Year's Eve 2016, Rotissimo had its Russian premiere at the State Academic Capella of Saint Petersburg, with Sergey Dogadin, violin solo and Julian Milkis, clarinet solo.

In 2015 Mr. Goldstein composed Neapolitan Symphony, a sometimes flirtatious, sometimes pensive work, inspired by the Neapolitan Dance from Tchaikovskiy's Swan Lake World premiere of Neapolitan Symphony was on December 1, 2016, in Bursa, Turkey by Sinfoni Orchestrati, conducted by Mikhail Kirchhoff.

In 2017 Mr. Goldstein completed Introspective Trio. It premiered in 2019 in Arlington, VA by National Chamber Ensemble, Leo Shushansky, artistic director. Also composed in 2017 was Rhapsody on the Theme of Albinoni. It premiered in Khazan, Tatarstan by Primavera Chamber Orchestra with Rustem Abyazov, Violin, (Russia) and Mark Drobinsky, Cello (France). Also in 2017 Mr. Goldstein composed nostalgic "Romancing the Eyes," inspired by the ultra popular Ochi Chornye romance, performed by Alexandra Carlson.

In 2018, Maestro Goldstein composed Amarcord Variations for Clarinet Solo.

In 2020 Mr. Goldstein composed a cycle of Russian Romances to poems from "One-way Correspondence", a book of poetry by Marina Berkovich. Some of these romances premiered in Moscow in 2021, at Leo Tolstoy's Home-Museum, performed by Victoria Dmitrieva-Goldstein (no relation).

In 2021 Maestro Goldstein composed Symphonic Poem To Be Or Not To Be to Hamlet's soliloquy by William Shakespeare.

In 2022 Maestro Goldstein wrote another orchestration of Rotissimo for Violin, Cello, Piano and String Orchestra by special commission of Camerata of Naples. Same year, The Beauty Of Ostinato for String Orchestra and Bass Guitar was completed.

Filmography 
Alexander Goldstein composed music scores for 26 feature films including:
 2009 Attrakzion (TV mini-series)
 1992 Love in Moscow
 1991 Nomer Luks dlya Generala s Devochkoi
 1991 Oblako-ray
 1990 Neotstreliannaya Muzyka
 1990 Vybor
 1990 Yego zhena kuritsa
 1990 Vanka-vstanka
 1989 Zhena kerosinshchika
 1989 Ya v polnom poryadke
 1988 Bomzh (Bez opredelyonnogo mesta zhitelstva)
 1987 Staraya azbuka
 1987 Muzykalnaya Smena
 1986 Chelovek s akkordeonom
 1986 Veruyu v lyubov
 1985 Bereg
 1982 Assol
 1981 Ozhidaetsa Poholodania i Sneg
 1979 Tut, Nedaleko...

Alexander Goldstein composed music scores for two silent classics of world cinema:
 1928 Storm Over Asia by Vsevolod Pudovkinmusic score composed 1985
 1926 The Case of Three Million by Yakov Protazanov music score composed 1987

Alexander Goldstein composed music scores for animations and approximately 300 documentaries including:
 2007 Orange Winter
 2006 Konstantin and Mouse
 2005 Silk Road Festival
 2005 USA – Russia Star Wars
 2002 Vasya
 2002 Energy
 2002 One Year Later
 2001 Six Days
 2001 Gagarin
 2000 Gore – Bush
 2000 Alaska
 1989 Mir vam, Sholom
 1985 Lyubov Orlova
 1984 Alhimik
 1983 Devochka i piraty
 1983 Myshonok i koshka
 1982 Volshcbinoe Lekarstvo
 1981 Prihodi Na Katok

Alexander Goldstein performed music editing and music supervising for animations and documentaries including:
 1996 Spheres
 1984–1973 Nu, pogodi! Episodes 7–14 (music editing)
 1979 Que Viva Mexico (music supervising)

Alexander Goldstein directed and edited films, documentaries, television shows and animations including:
 2022 Southwest Florida Jewish Pioneers: Jack Nortman, Boxcar Education Giant
 2021 Southwest Florida Jewish Pioneers: Sheldon Starman, Down The Memory Line
 2021 Southwest Florida Jewish Pioneers: Gene Goodman, The Song Meister
 2021 Southwest Florida Jewish Pioneers: Mayor With A Heart
 2020 Southwest Florida Jewish Pioneers: Florence Hertzman, By The Pier
 2020 Southwest Florida Jewish Pioneers: Irving Berzon, Engineering The Future
 2019 Southwest Florida Jewish Pioneers: Chief Plager
 2019 Southwest Florida Jewish Pioneers: Judith and Samuel Friedland, The Power of Two
 2018 Southwest Florida Jewish Pioneers: Greensteins of Marco Island
 2018 Southwest Florida Jewish Pioneers: Elena Rosner, When Destiny Called
 2018 Southwest Florida Jewish Pioneers: Murray Hendel, Murray's Mile
 2017 Southwest Florida Jewish Pioneers: The Labodas of Fort Myers
 2017 Southwest Florida Jewish Pioneers: Stuart Kaye, A Mench for All Reasons
 2016 We Testify: Hidden Children, produced for the Holocaust Museum of Southwest Florida 
 2015 Southwest Florida Jewish Pioneers: Richard Segalman, The Man and His Art
 2015 Southwest Florida Jewish Pioneers: Gloria Lipman-Goldberg and Bill Lipman, Two of The 6L's
 2015 Southwest Florida Jewish Pioneers: Helen Weinfeld
 2014 We Testify: Testimony to Truth, produced for the Holocaust Museum of Southwest Florida
 2013 Naples, Florida: Redefining Paradise
 2011 Naples Oral Histories: If These Walls Could Talk, produced for Naples Historical Society
 2010 We Got It Good
 2009 Kings of the Dance II
 2008 Voshozhdenie s Olimpa
 2006 Kings of the Dance (Named by New York Magazine as top 10 cultural events of 2006)
 2005 Well Done (TV Show, 2 27-minute episodes)
 2005 Time Out (TV Show 121 27-minute episodes)
 2005–2002 Progulki po Broadway (TV Show 50 26-minute episodes)
 2002 Gariki I Cheloveki (5-part documentary)

SportMusic 
Leading into 1980 Summer Olympics in Moscow, Alexander Goldstein was instrumental in converting live piano accompaniment of gymnastics floor exercise to audio tape recording. Together with Lyudmila Pakhomova, he established a music training program for coaches at GITIS Russian Academy of Theater Arts. He has created such unforgettable ice dance music programs as La Cumparsita for Liudmila Pakhomova and Alexander Gorshkov, Polovtsian Dances for Natalia Bestemianova and Andrei Bukin, and popularized western music in the USSR during the Cold War by using such pop songs as: Afric Simone's Hafanana for Marina Cherkasova and Sergei Shakhrai, and Louis Armstrong's rendition of What a Wonderful World. He is also Merit Coach of Figure Skating Federation of Russia and collaborated with such coaches as: Elena Tchaikovskaia, Tatiana Tarasova, Nikolai Morozov, Robin Wagner, Igor Shpilband and Marina Zoueva. He has created music arrangements for 10-time Canadian National Figure Skating Champions Shae-Lynn Bourne and Victor Kraatz, and Bulgarian World Figure Skating Champions Albena Denkova and Maxim Staviski based on Tomaso Albinoni's Adagio.
 2007-2008 skating season Hip Hawk was composed by Alexander Goldstein based on Swan Lake by Pyotr Tchaikovsky and choreographed by Nikolai Morozov for Daisuke Takahashi of Japan, introducing Hip hop music genre to competitive figure skating and creating a new trend. 
In Elena Tchaikovskaia's 1986 book titled "Figure Skating", she is quoted saying: (translated) Alexander Goldstein created dozens, even hundreds of brilliant musical compositions. They were different in nature, but always brought a profound aesthetic pleasure to the performers, coaches and millions of viewers. I have no doubt that readers of all ages have heard at least once, songs of Alexander Goldstein performed by L. Pakhomova, A. Gorshkov, A. Zaitsev, N. Linichuk, G. Karponossov, V. Kovalev and many of our other top skaters.
Alexander Goldstein Category A figure skating coach in USA and Merit Coach of Russian Federation.

SportMusic.com Label CD Releases 
 2017 Waltz for Paul Mauriat
 2017 Tunes for Future Champions (digital album)
 2014 ICE WATER FLOOR, The Twisted Classics Collection
 2011 Figure Skating Classics

Awards 
Alexander has received 2015 Siver TELLY Awards for WE TESTIFY: Testimony to Truth, Telly Awards for Naples Oral Histories: "If These Walls Could Talk" and for "Naples, Florida REDEFINING PARADISE," :Southwest Florida Jewish Pioneers: Richard Segalman," Videographer Awards for "We Got It Good" and "Kings of the Dance II", an AVA Platinum Award for "Naples Oral Histories: 'If These Walls Could Talk", a Choice Star Award from Naples Daily News, and Hermes Awards for "Naples, Florida REDEFINING PARADISE" and "Because Someone Believed in Me". Many films that included Alexander's participation were awarded State Prize and USSR and International film festival awards in various countries. Alexander is also awarded Merit Coach of Figure Skating Federation of Russia.

References

External links 
 
 
 Alexander Goldstein Filmography on Fandango
 Alexander Goldstein on KinoPoisk – all films planet
 The New York Times – Alexander Goldstein profile
 Goldstein's role in Meryl Davis & Charlie White's win
 Washington Post 2/28/2010 – The music of Olympic figure skating isn't what it could be
 Naples Daily News 2/23/2010 – All Four Medal Contenders Use Music Created By Alexander Goldstein
 Naples Daily News 2/11/2010 – A Composer To The Olympic Stars
 Dr. Roberta E. Zlokower's review of Kings of the Dance. Opening film produced by Alexander Goldstein
 Faculty Artist Series Eastman School of Music University of Rochester – Mikhail Kopelman, violin: Holocaust 70th Anniversary Memorial Concert play music composed by Alexander Goldstein

American film producers
American people of Russian-Jewish descent
Jewish American classical composers
Jewish classical composers
Russian film producers
American film directors
Russian film directors
American film score composers
Russian film score composers
Russian composers
Russian male composers
Musicians from Moscow
Living people
American figure skating coaches
Russian figure skating coaches
1948 births
American male film score composers
21st-century American Jews